Alan Partridge is a fictional character in Channel 4 soap Brookside. He was portrayed by Dicken Ashworth from 1983 until 1985. He was the first resident to live at No. 6 (the bungalow).

Background
Alan was introduced as a computer expert, which represented for producer Phil Redmond the 'micro-electronic technical revolution' of the early 1980s. At the time he moved in he had a long-term partner, Samantha (Sam, played by Dinah May) who lived elsewhere.

Storylines

Introduction
Alan turned up on the close on 5 April 1983; one day before he moves in and measures the outside of his house by striding around much the amusement of neighbours Paul (Jim Wiggins) and Annabelle Collins (Doreen Sloane), Roger Huntingdon (Rob Spendlove) and Petra Taylor (Alexandra Pigg).

Relationships
While other families in Brookside were bringing more socially-observant stories regarding employment, trade-unionism, the black market and other issues of the Zeitgeist, the stories involving Alan principally related to his love-life. After moving onto Brookside Close, he asked his partner Sam (Dinah May) to marry him; while she refused his offer, she did agree to live with him. Later, Sam asked Alan to marry her; however, when the day came, she jilted him and left for Los Angeles. Alan then got together with his former partner Liz. After Alan got into trouble for plagiarism after helping Gordon Collins (Nigel Crowley) sell one of his computer programmes, he realised Liz was behind it and threw her out. In revenge for this, Liz arranged for Alan to be attacked and he was viciously assaulted. When Sam returned from Los Angeles, she and Alan got back together. They married on 17 July 1984. After marrying, they left and moved to Kuwait.

Reception
Katy Brent from Closer said that Alan was a reason to still miss Brookside after it was cancelled. She added that "Yes, there really was a Brookside character called Alan Partridge. He was the first resident of the bungalow and (as far as we know) had nothing to do with Radio Norwich."

References

Partridge, Alan
Partridge, Alan